Kirchlauter is a municipality in the Bavarian Administrative Region of Lower Franconia in the district of Haßberge in Germany. It is a part of the Verwaltungsgemeinde of Ebelsbach.

Geography
Kirchlauter lies in the Main-Rhön Region (Bavarian Planungsregion 3).

It consists of the following boroughs:  Kirchlauter, Neubrunn, and Pettstadt.

History
The municipality was first documented on 30 December 1145.  Kirchlauter belonged to the manor of the Barons (Freiherren) of Guttenberg.  Traditionally part of Bavaria, in 1810 it became a part of the Grand Duchy of Würzburg, with which it became part of Bavaria for the final time in 1814.

Politics

The Municipal Council of Kirchlauter is made up of 13 councilmen, including the town's mayor, Jochen Steppert (CSU).

The mandate assignments in the Municipal Council are CSU 7, SPD 4, Junge Liste 1, and Free Voters 1.

References

The information in this article is based on a translation of its German equivalent.

Haßberge (district)